The third inauguration of Vladimir Putin as the President of Russia took place on Monday, May 7, 2012, in the Grand Kremlin Palace.

The ceremony was attended by about three thousand people, including ministers, governors, deputies, senators, foreign ambassadors and religious leaders, as well as Russian scientists and artists.

Background

Vladimir Putin won the election with more than sixty percent of the votes. He took office two months after the elections.

Ceremony

Initial part

At the beginning of the ceremony Kremlin Regiment soldiers carried the Flag of Russia, Flag of the Russian President, Constitution of Russia and Sign of the President of Russia.

Then there was called by Chairman of the Federation Council Valentina Matviyenko, Chairman of the State Duma Sergey Naryshkin and Chairman of the Constitutional Court Valery Zorkin.

At this time, outgoing President Dmitry Medvedev, left the residence of the President of Russia and went to the Cathedral Square, to accept the report of the commander of the Kremlin Regiment and thank soldiers for their service. After that, Medvedev went to the State Kremlin Palace for the ceremony.

Then Vladimir Putin left the White House, where he was the Prime Minister of Russia, and went to the Kremlin.

At noon, when the bells of the Kremlin clock rung, Vladimir Putin entered St George's Hall and walked to the podium located in the St. Andrew Hall.

Speech of Dmitry Medvedev

The first speech was made by the outgoing President Dmitry Medvedev:

The Oath

After the speech Dmitry Medvedev and Chairman of the Constitutional Court Valery Zorkin invited Vladimir Putin to take the oath:

Vladimir Putin read the text of the oath:

After that, the Russian national anthem sounded, followed by a thirty-one salvo Artillery salute.

Speech of Vladimir Putin

Vladimir Putin delivered his speech as President of Russia:

After the speech, Vladimir Putin headed for the exit, passing accepting congratulations.

Final part

Before the start of the final part, Vladimir Putin and Dmitry Medvedev retired to a closed room where former President presented the new President with a "nuclear briefcase".

After receiving "nuclear briefcase", Putin and Medvedev went to the Cathedral Square, where the former President presented the Kremlin regiment of the new Supreme Commander. After that a parade and review of troops was held.

After all this, President Putin and his wife went to the Cathedral of the Annunciation, where a prayer service in the service to the Fatherland was held.

Then they went to the informal part of the inauguration ceremony.

Foreign response

A number of foreign leaders congratulated President Vladimir Putin upon his assumption of office. Among them are: Syrian President Bashar Assad, President of Armenia Serzh Sargsyan, President of Belarus Alexander Lukashenko, President of Ukraine Viktor Yanukovych, Chinese President Hu Jintao and others.

Incidents

During the ceremony, there were two unplanned incidents.

First – applause were unplanned, took place during the release of the State Duma Chairman Sergey Naryshkin. Typically, the output Chairmen of Chambers of the Parliament is not accompanied by applause.

Second – there was a microphone error. When Chairman of the Constitutional Court Valery Zorkin invited Vladimir Putin to take the oath. Putin was initially unable to speak because the microphone did not work for several seconds. The ceremony continued once the microphone had been fixed.

See also
First inauguration of Vladimir Putin
Second inauguration of Vladimir Putin
Fourth inauguration of Vladimir Putin

References

2012 in Moscow
May 2012 events in Russia
Putin 3
Events in Moscow
Ceremonies in Russia
Vladimir Putin